The Midwest PGA Championship is a golf tournament that is the championship of the Midwest section of the PGA of America. The section was formed in 1924, encompassing the states of Missouri and Kansas. Records kept by the section track winners back to 1960. It is unclear whether there were championship tournaments held before that time. Sam Reynolds, club pro from Kansas City, Missouri holds the record with most victories, winning five championships in the 1960s. Two-time PGA Tour winner Tom Pernice Jr. won the title three straight years, from 1994–96. Former New York Yankees pitcher Ralph Terry won the 1980 tournament after he retired from his baseball career.

Winners 

 2021 Robert Russell
 2020 Robert Russell
 2019 Scott Wempe
 2018 Rob Wilkin
 2017 Bryan Daniels
 2016 Rob Wilkin
 2015 Sean Dougherty
 2014 Bryan Daniels
 2013 Blake Graham
 2012 Matt Seitz
 2011 Sean Dougherty
 2010 Sean Dougherty
 2009 Blake Graham
 2008 Steve Gotsche
 2007 John Richman
 2006 Rob Wilkin
 2005 Matt Seitz
 2004 Rob Wilkin
 2003 Jim Kane
 2002 James Farrell
 2001 Rob Wilkin
 2000 Matt Seitz
 1999 Dan Key
 1998 Rob Wilkin
 1997 Rob Wilkin
 1996 Tom Pernice Jr.
 1995 Tom Pernice Jr.
 1994 Tom Pernice Jr.
 1993 John Sherman
 1992 Bryan Norton
 1991 Billy Peterson
 1990 Rob Wilkin
 1989 Brad Sater
 1988 Rob Wilkin
 1987 Ross Randall
 1986 Billy Peterson
 1985 Tom Dawson
 1984 Ray Streeter
 1983 Randy Towner
 1982 Bob Stone
 1981 Perry Leslie
 1980 Ralph Terry
 1979 Bob Stone
 1978 Gary Clark
 1977 John Bonella
 1976 Bob Stone
 1975 Bob Stone
 1974 Jim Davis
 1973 Brien Boggess
 1972 Everett Vinzant
 1971 Stan Thirsk
 1970 Stan Thirsk
 1969 Bob Stone
 1968 Herman Scharlau
 1967 Everett Vinzant
 1966 Sam Reynolds
 1965 Sam Reynolds
 1964 Sam Reynolds
 1963 Herman Scharlau
 1962 Joe Jimenez
 1961 Sam Reynolds
 1960 Sam Reynolds

External links 
PGA of America – Midwest section

Golf in Kansas
Golf in Missouri
PGA of America sectional tournaments
Recurring sporting events established in 1960
Sports in the Midwestern United States